Daniel Grayson may refer to:

Daniel Grayson, character in Revenge (TV series)
Daniel Grayson, co-developer of the Macaulay2 computer algebra system